Pseudicius matabelensis is a species of jumping spider in the genus Pseudicius that lives in Namibia and Zimbabwe. It was first described in 2011.

References

Salticidae
Spiders described in 2011
Spiders of Africa
Arthropods of Namibia
Arthropods of Zimbabwe